Parahypopta caestrum is a species of moth of the family Cossidae. It is found on the Iberian Peninsula and in France, Italy, Austria, the Czech Republic, Slovakia, Hungary, on the Balkan Peninsula, as well as in Jordan, Israel, Syria, Iraq, Turkey, south-western Russia and Kazakhstan.

The wingspan is 28–40 mm. Adults have been recorded on wing in June and July.

The larvae feed on Asparagus officinalis, Asparagus maritime, Asparagus tenuifolis, Asparagus albus, Asparagus acutifolis, and Celtis australis.

Subspecies
Parahypopta caestrum caestrum
Parahypopta caestrum caucasica (Grum-Grshimailo, 1902) (Caucasus, Transcaucasia)

References

External links

Lepiforum.de

Moths described in 1804
Cossinae
Moths of Europe
Insects of Turkey
Taxa named by Jacob Hübner